Sugarloaf Mountain is a summit located in Central New York Region of New York located in the Town of Webb in Herkimer County, northeast of Old Forge.

References

Mountains of Herkimer County, New York
Mountains of New York (state)